Karl Angerer (born 18 July 1979 in Berchtesgaden) is a former German bobsledder who had competed between 1999 and 2012. He won a gold medal in the mixed bobsleigh-skeleton team event at the 2007 FIBT World Championships in St. Moritz.

At the 2010 Winter Olympics, he finished seventh in the four-man and ninth in the two-man events.

References

Mixed bobsleigh-skeleton world championship medalists since 2007

1979 births
Living people
People from Berchtesgaden
Sportspeople from Upper Bavaria
German male bobsledders
Bobsledders at the 2010 Winter Olympics
Olympic bobsledders of Germany